Portland International Raceway (PIR) is a motorsport facility in Portland in the U.S. state of Oregon. It is part of the Delta Park complex on the former site of Vanport, just south of the Columbia River. It lies west of the Delta Park/Vanport light rail station and less than a mile west of Interstate 5.

The track hosts the IndyCar Series, ICSCC and SCCA and OMRRA road racing, the NASCAR K&N Pro Series West, and SCCA autocross events. Additionally, the PIR grounds are host to OBRA (Oregon Bicycle Racing Association) bicycling races on the track and the surrounding grounds. The facility includes a dragstrip and a motocross track.

The road course is almost perfectly flat and runs clockwise. Two track configurations are possible. Portland is classified as an FIA Grade Two circuit.

The City of Portland is working to establish the track as carbon neutral.

History

PIR is built on the former location of Vanport, Oregon, which was destroyed on Memorial Day, May 30, 1948, when a railroad berm broke and water from the Columbia River flooded the city.  After the flood, all that remained were the paved streets and concrete foundations of destroyed buildings.

The first races took place on these old city streets in 1961 during the Portland Rose Festival.  Since then, the Rose Cup has become an annual event.  Racing at "West Delta Park", as PIR was known back then, was quite dangerous.  Racers leaving the track unexpectedly could collide with leftover concrete foundations or fall into ponds.

Under the threat of losing the Rose Cup races, since many of the sanctioning racing bodies would no longer sanction races due to the deteriorating roads and dangerous obstacles, the track was finally paved in the 1970s.

In 1975, Portland International hosted the Trans-Am Series, the premier series of the Sports Car Club of America, which was won by John Greenwood, driving a Chevrolet Corvette.  Greenwood would go on to win the 1975 Trans-Am Series Championship.

Beginning in 1984, Portland International began hosting the cars and stars of the PPG Indycar World Series, with Al Unser Jr. taking his first win, driving a Cosworth powered March.

In 1999 and 2000, the NASCAR Craftsman Truck Series ran a race at Portland International Raceway.  The race was added after the demise of the ½-mile Portland Speedway that hosted races early in the series. The 1999 running saw the first (and as of 2021, the only) time there were more than one African-Americans competing in the same NASCAR top-three division race, with Bill Lester and Bobby Norfleet on the grid.

At the end of 2007 and the beginning of 2008, PIR went through a track renovation.  The track was repaved with new asphalt and some minor changes were made to the track layout.  Turns 4-7 were widened.  The fence on the inside of turn 6 was moved to provide a better sightline through the corner. Turn 7 was sharpened to slow down racers prior to entering the back straight. Formula One-style curbs were also installed on the track. The track reopened on February 23, 2008, with a ribbon cutting ceremony.

In September 2018, the Grand Prix of Portland returned after an 11-year hiatus. The qualifying record is 0:57.3467, set by Will Power during the 2018 Grand Prix of Portland.

On September 29, 2021, it was announced that the NASCAR Xfinity Series would race there in the regular season.

On December 8, 2022, it was announced that Formula E would race in there with a modified layout in the 2022–23 season instead of Brooklyn Street Circuit.

Lap records
The unofficial outright all-time lap record set during a race weekend is 55.760 seconds, set by Wayne Taylor on the old circuit layout, in an Intrepid RM-1-Chevrolet, during qualifying for the 1991 G.I. Joe's/Camel Grand Prix Presented by Nissan. The official race lap records at Portland International Raceway are listed as:

IndyCar race history

IMSA Sports Car race history

Formula E race history

See also
 List of sports venues in Portland, Oregon

References

Further reading

External links

 Portland International Raceway official site
 Trackpedia guide to driving this track
 Friends of PIR
 Oregon Motorcycle Road Racing Association OMRRA
 Unofficial History of PIR
 Aerial imagery from Google Earth of Portland International Raceway as an overlay on an old photo of Vanport City, Oregon
 Short video about, and on the history, of Portland International Raceway

Sports venues in Portland, Oregon
Champ Car circuits
NHRA Division 6 drag racing venues
Motorsport venues in Oregon
American Le Mans Series circuits
IMSA GT Championship circuits
1960 establishments in Oregon
Kenton, Portland, Oregon
IndyCar Series tracks
NASCAR tracks
Sports venues completed in 1960